The Church of Saint Joan of Arc is a Roman Catholic parish church located in Nice, France. Noticeable for its original architecture, the church is dedicated to Joan of Arc.

The style of this church is controversial among the inhabitants of Nice, judged ugly by some. The church is sometime nicknamed "the Meringue" for its white color.

History
In 1914, Father Quillery was appointed parish priest of the new parish of Saint Jérome. The first projects for a new church are proposed. French architect Louis Castel initiated in 1914 its construction and built a crypt. After World War I, another French architect Jacques Droz constructed in 1924 a second crypt. Both crypts are the support of the new building. In 1931 a concrete basement is laid over the two crypts. Between 1932 and 1934, the church was built using reinforced concrete.

Architecture
The use of reinforced concrete, a new material at that time, allowed an original construction in a style influenced by Art Deco. Eight ellipsoidal domes support three larger ovoid domes. The angular form of the  steeple is in opposition with the strong curves of the domes.

The  fresco paintings of the stations of the Cross were executed by Eugène Klementieff in 1934. The paintings are influenced by Russian Cubism, Italian Quattrocento and Byzantine Orthodox icons.

References
Citations

Bibliography

External links

 Sainte Jeanne d'Arc Church with NiceRendezVous (in French)
 Nice-rendezvous (in English)

Roman Catholic churches in Nice
Joan of Arc
Roman Catholic churches completed in 1934
20th-century Roman Catholic church buildings in France
Tourist attractions in Nice
Art Nouveau church buildings in France
Art Deco architecture in France
Modernist architecture in France
1914 establishments in France